Dewan Bahadur Satya Prakash Singha (1893–1948) was a politician of colonial India, and later, Pakistan, who served as the Speaker of the British Indian Punjab assembly. He was member of the Punjab Assembly between 1947 and 1948.

Early life and family
He was born to a Christian family in Pasrur, Sialkot in 1893 with ancestry of a Bihari grandfather and a Bengali grandmother. His mother was a Punjabi and he married a woman from the United Provinces (UP) of British India.

Career
He served as registrar in the Punjab University. Due to his efforts matric examination system and intermediate level degrees were introduced to education system in colonial India. In his recognition for his services, he was awarded the distinction of Dewan Bahadur by the British Indian government.

The majority of Indian Christians, represented by the All India Conference of Indian Christians, were allies of the Indian National Congress, and opposed the partition of India. However, Singha was present when the Lahore Resolution was passed in March of 1940, a resolution which called for British-India to be divided into independent states. In 1942, Singha created his own All-Indian Christian Association, and in November that year when the Muslim League held its annual convention in Faisalabad, it assured Jinnah of Indian Christian solidarity in the creation of Pakistan. Soon after this, Singha said in a public statement: “At the time of partition of the sub-continent of India, in the entire country, the Christians should be counted with Muslims.” In November of 1946 at another gathering in the Punjab, Singha declared that “Jinnah is our leader”, and Jinnah responded by saying: “We will never forget the favors and sacrifices of Christians.” In Punjab, a "rival Christian group led by Mr Banerjee argued that they wanted a united India but, if partition took place, then they would want to be in India." In reality, "Christians of the Punjab [were] demographically hamstrung, as regardless what side they wanted to support, they were mainly present in Muslim majority areas."

With partition imminent, Singha was appointed as Speaker of the Punjab Assembly, who advocated that Punjab be included with Pakistan. The Assembly met in June of 1947 to decide the question, and an armed Sikh leader announced that he would attack anyone who voted in favor of Punjab uniting with Pakistan. Ishtiaq Ahmed writes that:

Being the Speaker of the Assembly of British India's Punjab Province, Satya Prakash Singha himself did not cast a vote.

After the creation of Pakistan in 1947, Singha was told that only a Muslim could serve as the Speaker of the Assembly, and a motion of no confidence was passed against him; Singha was ousted from his post. Singha died in 1948 and in 1958, Singha's family left Pakistan and moved to independent India.

Legacy

In 2016, a Pakistani postal stamp was issued in his honour.

References

1893 births
1948 deaths
Pakistani Christians
People from Sialkot District
Punjab, Pakistan MLAs 1947–1949
Pakistani people of Bengali descent
Pakistani people of Bihari descent